Carex buekii, the banat sedge, is a species of flowering plant in the genus Carex, native to central, southeastern and eastern Europe, the Caucasus region, Anatolia, and the northern Levant. It forms large stands in the floodplains of central European rivers.

References

buekii
Flora of Central Europe
Flora of Southeastern Europe
Flora of Eastern Europe
Flora of the Caucasus
Flora of Syria
Plants described in 1851